Hermann Buse (27 February 1907 – 1 January 1945) was a German professional road bicycle racer, professional between 1929 and 1937. He won Liège–Bastogne–Liège in 1930. Buse was born in Berlin and died in Bremen.

Palmarès 

 1930
 1st, Overall, Deutschland Tour
 1st, Liège–Bastogne–Liège
 1931
 1st, Stage 8, Deutschland Tour, Liegnit
 1937
 3rd National Road Championships

External links 

German male cyclists
1907 births
1945 deaths
Cyclists from Berlin